The 2022–23 Port Vale F.C. season is the club's 111th season in the English Football League, and first season back in EFL League One following promotion out of EFL League Two with victory in the 2022 play-off final. The season covers the period from 1 July 2022 to 30 June 2023. It is manager Darrell Clarke's second full season in charge of the club.

In a compacted pre-season, the club signed seven players permanently and brought in a further six on loan, whilst six first-team players were moved on. Having won their opening game on 30 July, Vale picked up four points from five games in August, whilst they exited the EFL Cup at the first round. Summer signing Ellis Harrison soon found his form though, scoring five goals from seven league games, whilst the Vale qualified for the knock-out stages of the EFL Trophy with one group game to spare. Despite facing a difficult run of fixtures in the month of October, they picked up ten points to firmly establish themselves in mid-table. They added four points from four league games in November and also advanced into the Round of 16 of the EFL Trophy. Vale ended 2022 in ninth place, though were knocked out of the EFL Trophy by Salford City.

Port Vale had a quiet January transfer window, with two loan signings coming and three senior players outgoing on a permanent basis. They went on to pick up just four points from seven league games in February.

Overview

EFL League One
Having achieved promotion out of EFL League Two via the play-offs, the Port Vale squad had a shorter summer break than most other EFL League One clubs as their final game was on 28 May rather than 30 April. As a result, director of football David Flitcroft said that players would be having a phased return to training, with players who featured in more games taking longer to report back for the pre-season training camp in Spain. The first summer signing was Lewis Cass, who had played for the club on loan from Newcastle United in the 2021–22 season. Seeking experienced League One players, the club signed Belgian midfielder Funso Ojo following his release from Scottish Premiership club Aberdeen. Meanwhile Aaron Martin and Jake Taylor were sold on, to Eastleigh and Morecambe respectively. The club brought in number of signings in the last week of July: 20-year old former Watford defender Derek Agyakwa (who had been at the club on trial), 21-year old former Stoke City defender Will Forrester, 29-year old former Wigan Athletic attacker Gavin Massey, and 17-year old Southampton loanee defender Thierry Small. Rory Holden, a 24-year old midfielder who had played under Clarke at Walsall, was also signed after spending pre-season with the club. Vale opened the season at Vale Park with a 2–1 win over Fleetwood Town; centre-backs Nathan Smith and Connor Hall scored within two minutes of each other complete a comeback victory after Daniel Batty opened the scoring on six minutes.

Having won on the opening day, Vale then fell to a heavy 4–0 defeat at fellow newly-promoted side Exeter City, with Jamie Proctor having to make do with 17-year old attacking midfielder Tommy McDermott as a strike partner in the midst of a shortage of specialist forwards on the books. One specialist forward was signed on 11 August, Welshman Ellis Harrison arrived for an undisclosed fee from Fleetwood Town, having previously won two promotions under Clarke at Bristol Rovers. Goalkeeper Jack Stevens also arrived on a season-long loan from Oxford United. Both signings made their debuts in an entertaining 0–0 home draw with Bolton Wanderers, in which the away side were reduced to ten men after Ricardo Santos was sent off on 37 minutes. Vale went on to lose 2–1 away at Milton Keynes Dons, where a brace from  Bradley Johnson gave the hosts their first points of the campaign, and after the match Clarke defended his decision to rotate the squad to rest players. Vale went on to pick up their first away win of the campaign at struggling Burton Albion, winning 2–0 after Ben Garrity and Ellis Harrison scored second half goals. However they ended August with a 1–0 home defeat to Portsmouth. As the transfer window drew to a close, the club signed 19-year old Irish striker Mipo Odubeko on a season-long loan from West Ham United. The club made three further loan signings on transfer deadline day: 22-year old Blackburn Rovers striker Daniel Butterworth, 22-year old Cremonese winger Dennis Politic, and 21-year old winger Stoke City winger Liam McCarron; Politic had impressed on loan at the club the previous summer, whilst McCarron became the first Stoke player to be loaned directly to Vale since March 1978 in what was heralded as a "new era" between the two Potteries derby rivals. Chris Hussey also had his contract terminated and signed with Stockport County.

On 3 September, Vale conceded a stoppage-time equaliser at home to Cheltenham Town after having come from behind to lead 2–1 at half-time. Ten days later, Vale came from behind thanks to a late Harrison header to draw 1–1 at Barnsley; Stevens received praise for his performance after making a number of good saves. Two goals from Harrison earned the Vale a 2–1 victory at home to Shrewsbury Town, taking his tally to five goals in seven games. However, Vale then slipped to a 3–0 defeat at Peterborough United, where Jonson Clarke-Harris scored a brace.

A crowd of 11,336 turned out to witness a 1–0 home defeat to Sheffield Wednesday on 1 October, with Will Vaulks's "thunderbolt from distance" separating the two teams. Seven days later, a crowd of 28,706 came to Pride Park Stadium to witness the Vale come from behind to beat Derby County 2–1 despite Tom Conlon missing a penalty; the referee awarded Vale another penalty in the second half, which Ellis Harrison converted, and after Derby goalscorer James Collins was sent off for an elbow on Smith, James Wilson scored his first goal of the campaign to win the game on 66 minutes. The attendance for this game was the biggest league crowd to witness a Vale match since 1998 and the largest to witness a Vale victory since 1955. Vale came from two goals down to draw 2–2 at home to Forest Green Rovers, with Ellis Harrison converting penalty for the second successive game. They went on to pick up three points away at Cambridge United courtesy of an own goal eleven minutes from full-time. Vale lost 3–2 at home to Ipswich Town despite coming from two goals down to level the scorelines with goals either side of the half-time whistle. Vale beat Lincoln City 1–0, with Daniel Butterworth scoring his first goal for the club, and after the match assistant manager Andy Crosby praised the squad and said that: "following six games in the month, to pick up ten points against the calibre of opponents we have played has made it a really good month".

Vale opened November with a 2–2 draw at Wycombe Wanderers, having twice come from a goal down to secure a point with goals from James Wilson and Tom Conlon. Billy Bodin and Matty Taylor – who had both played for Darrell Clarke at Bristol Rovers – scored braces to condemn Vale to a 4–0 defeat at Oxford United. Clarke said that the match showed that the club still had to go "a long way to be an established League One team". Playing on the day before the 2022 FIFA World Cup started, Vale recorded a 1–0 home win over Charlton Athletic, with Daniel Butterworth scoring the only goal of the game with what the club website described as "a beautiful second half solo goal". However, Charlton manager Ben Garner labelled Vale as "anti football" and a team with "no ambition for them to go and really attack and take the game to you".

More than 400 Vale fans travelled down to witness a 2–0 victory against league leaders Plymouth Argyle on the Friday night of 2 December, with James Wilson being credited for both goals on the club website despite Tom Conlon initially being credited by news outlets for the opening goal of the game. Vale's three-match winning run came to an end with a 1–0 defeat at Bristol Rovers, where Aaron Collins won the match on 87 minutes. They beat Morecambe 1–0 at home in the boxing day fixture, with Gavin Massey scoring the only goal of the game with a "fantastic long-range strike" on 41 minutes. The year ended with a 2–0 defeat at Sheffield Wednesday, with Michael Smith scoring a first-half penalty and a curved strike from outside the box in the second half; the away support of 3,139 was the Vale's largest league away following since February 2002.

The new year began with a 3–1 comeback victory at Forest Green Rovers, as late goals from Mipo Odubeko, Ellis Harrison and Dennis Politic secured three points after Vale spent 84 minutes of the match a goal down. The first piece of January transfer window business was a departure, as Connor Hall was sold to Colchester United as he required a club closer to his Cambridgeshire home. Also leaving was central midfielder Brad Walker, who was sold on to Tranmere Rovers for an undisclosed fee. Sky Sports moved the home with game with Peterborough United to a freezing cold Monday night on 16 January, where a second-half brace from Ephron Mason-Clark secured an away victory for newly-appointed opposition manager Darren Ferguson. The following day, Harry Charsley's departure to League Two side Newport County was confirmed; similarly to Walker, he had struggled for gametime in central midfield. The first arrival of the window was 19-year old left-back Aaron Donnelly, who joined on loan from Nottingham Forest on 23 January. He was an unused substitute as the Vale were beaten 2–1 at home by Derby County the following day, where a goal from Ojo early in the second-half goal seemed to have won all three points for the Valiants, only for Derby to turn the game around with two goals in the space of two minutes starting with David McGoldrick's strike with just three minutes left of the ninety to play. Donnelly instead made his debut in a goalless draw at Cheltenham Town. On transfer deadline day, Tommy McDermott and James Plant were loaned out to Salisbury, whilst prolific 32-year old striker Matty Taylor joined on loan from Oxford United.

A poor performance meant that the Vale opened February with a 3–0 home defeat to Wycombe Wanderers. A frustrating 1–1 draw with Accrington Stanley followed, David Worrall's 57th-minute strike cancelling out Accrington's penalty after Ojo was penalised for a foul on Aaron Pressley, who converted the spot-kick; however, late in the game Butterworth missed a penalty which had been awarded to the Vale after Harvey Rodgers was sent off for using his hand to divert a header from Garrity off the goal line. A 3–2 defeat at Shrewsbury Town followed, which Clarke shouldered the blame for after admitting to picking the wrong starting eleven which left the side vulnerable to set-pieces. A 3–1 home defeat by Barnsley followed, with the visitors taking the lead within 60 seconds of the kick-off. A seven game run without a win came to an end with a 1–0 home victory over Exeter City, with Forrester scoring the only goal of the game one minute after the visitors were reduced to ten men. This was followed by a 1–0 defeat at Morecambe in a game where Vale were much the better side. They played well at Bolton Wanderers, scoring first through Harrison, but lost the game 2–1 after the home side scored twice within nine first-half minutes.

Donnelly scored his first career goal to secure a 1–0 home victory over Milton Keynes Dons. Vale then picked up a point on the road with a 1–1 draw at Fleetwood Town with Taylor opening his account for the club, before Jack Marriott equalised on 84 minutes. On 18 March, Harrison opened the scoring at home to Burton in the opening two minutes, but a collapse in team performance saw the struggling away side come back to win 3–2.

Finances
Port Vale received around £500,000 more from central payments from the Premier League and English Football League (EFL) as a League One club than they received in League Two. However £1.2 million was spent on improving Vale Park and making it a Championship standard ground. In January, the club stated that crowds of 10,000 would be needed to support the management in building a promotion winning team.

Cup competitions
Port Vale had a home tie with Exeter City (League One) in the first round of the FA Cup and Clarke was disappointed to lose the game 3–2, saying that "the second half was nowhere near the standards we set".

Vale were drawn at home to Rotherham United (Championship) in the first round of the EFL Cup and suffered a 2–1 defeat having trailed by two goals at half-time.

In the EFL Trophy they were drawn into a group with Shrewsbury Town (League One), Stockport County (League Two), and Wolverhampton Wanderers U21. They beat Stockport 1–0 in front of 1,980 spectators at Vale Park in a game that saw a senior debut for James Plant, a first club appearance for Mipo Odubeko and first club goal for Chris Hussey. Having beaten Shrewsbury Town at home in the league three days earlier, Vale picked up a 4–0 victory at the New Meadow, with Dennis Politic claiming a hat-trick and Jack Shorrock becoming the youngest player in the club's history at 15 years and 145 days old. First place in the group was confirmed with a 2–0	win over Wolverhampton Wanderers U21, where Derek Agyakwa and Rhys Walters made their first team debuts. They advanced into the Round of 16 with a 2–1 home win over Barnsley (League One) thanks to first-half goals from Dennis Politic and David Worrall. However, a disappointing 1–0 defeat at Salford City (League Two) concluded Vale's cup campaigns.

Results

Pre-season

League One

League table

Results summary

Results by matchday

Matches

On 23 June, the league fixtures were announced.

FA Cup

EFL Cup

EFL Trophy

Squad statistics

Appearances and goals

Top scorers

Disciplinary record

Transfers

Transfers in

Transfers out

Loans in

Loans out

References

Port Vale
Port Vale F.C. seasons